The Subashi Formation is a Late Cretaceous (Campanian to Maastrichtian)  formation from the Xinjiang Autonomous Region of western China. Initially described by Dong Zhiming in 1977, the formation contains remains of Tarbosaurus which were initially described as a separate taxon Shanshanosaurus huoyanshanensis. Remains of a sauropod, likely Nemegtosaurus, and a hadrosaurid, likely  Jaxartosaurus, have also been found.

The formation is located in the Flaming Mountains region of Xinjiang, north of the Turpan Depression.

Fossil content 
The following fossils were reported from the formation:

Reptiles
 Euoplocephalus sp.
 Gravemys hutchisoni
 Jaxartosaurus
 Nemegtosaurus pachi - "Teeth." - (sauropod indet.)
 Tarbosaurus bataar
 Tyrannosaurus turpanensis - "Teeth and sacral vertebrae." - (tyrannosauroid indet.)
 Coelurosauria indet.
 Titanosauridae indet.

Fossil eggs
 Elongatoolithus andrewsi
 Elongatoolithus elongatus
 Ovaloolithus turpanensis

See also 
 Subashi (lost city)

References

Bibliography 

  
 
  
 
 
 
 
 
 
 

Geologic formations of China
Upper Cretaceous Series of Asia
Campanian Stage
Maastrichtian Stage
Mudstone formations
Sandstone formations
Ooliferous formations
Paleontology in Xinjiang